Koralegedera Nadeeja Ashen Bandara (born 23 November 1998), known as Ashen Bandara, is a professional Sri Lankan cricketer who plays limited over internationals for Sri Lanka. He made his international debut for the Sri Lanka cricket team in March 2021.

Domestic career
He made his Twenty20 debut for Galle Cricket Club in the 2015–16 Premier T20 Tournament on 6 January 2016.

In December 2017, he was named in Sri Lanka's squad for the 2018 Under-19 Cricket World Cup. He made his first-class debut for Saracens Sports Club in the 2017–18 Premier League Tournament on 15 February 2018. He made his List A debut for Saracens Sports Club in the 2017–18 Premier Limited Overs Tournament on 14 March 2018.

In March 2018, he was named in Galle's squad for the 2017–18 Super Four Provincial Tournament. The following month, he was also named in Galle's squad for the 2018 Super Provincial One Day Tournament. In August 2018, he was named in Colombo's squad the 2018 SLC T20 League. In March 2019, he was named in Dambulla's squad for the 2019 Super Provincial One Day Tournament.

In January 2020, he scored a century for Saracens Sports Club in the 2019–20 SLC Twenty20 Tournament. In October 2020, he was drafted by the Dambulla Viiking for the inaugural edition of the Lanka Premier League. In August 2021, he was named in the SLC Blues team for the 2021 SLC Invitational T20 League tournament. In November 2021, he was selected to play for the Jaffna Kings following the players' draft for the 2021 Lanka Premier League. In July 2022, he was signed by the Kandy Falcons for the third edition of the Lanka Premier League.

International career
In November 2019, he was named in Sri Lanka's squad for the 2019 ACC Emerging Teams Asia Cup in Bangladesh. Later the same month, he was named in Sri Lanka's squad for the men's cricket tournament at the 2019 South Asian Games. The Sri Lanka team won the silver medal, after they lost to Bangladesh by seven wickets in the final.

In February 2021, Bandara was named in Sri Lanka's limited overs squad for their series against the West Indies. He made his Twenty20 International (T20I) debut for Sri Lanka on 3 March 2021, against the West Indies. He made his One Day International (ODI) debut for Sri Lanka on 10 March 2021, also against the West Indies. On ODI debut, he scored his maiden ODI half century. In his third ODI match, he scored his second ODI half century, and with Wanidu Hasaranga, made an unbeaten 123-run partnership for the seventh-wicket.

On 1 October 2021, he was added to Sri Lanka's squad for the 2021 ICC Men's T20 World Cup. In April 2022, Sri Lanka Cricket (SLC) named him in the Sri Lanka Emerging Team's squad for their tour to England. In June 2022, he was named in the Sri Lanka A squad for their matches against Australia A during Australia's tour of Sri Lanka.

References

External links
 

1998 births
Living people
Sri Lankan cricketers
Sri Lanka One Day International cricketers
Sri Lanka Twenty20 International cricketers
Galle Cricket Club cricketers
Saracens Sports Club cricketers
Jaffna Kings cricketers
Cricketers from Galle
South Asian Games silver medalists for Sri Lanka
South Asian Games medalists in cricket